SMH may refer to:

Education
 Saint Mary's Hall (San Antonio), a school in Texas, US
 SMH School, Khatangi, rural Bihar, India
 Stonyhurst Saint Mary's Hall, a school in Lancashire, England

Hospitals
 Sarasota Memorial Hospital, Florida, US
 Strong Memorial Hospital, Rochester, New York, US
 Surrey Memorial Hospital, British Columbia, Canada

Media
 The Sydney Morning Herald, an Australian newspaper

Other
 Samei language of Yunnan, China, ISO 639 code
 "Smacking my head" or "Shaking my head" in SMS language
 Stamford Hill railway station in London, England, National Rail station code

See also
 SMHS (disambiguation)